California is an extended play (EP) by American DJ and record producer Diplo, released in March 2018.

Reception
Pitchfork rated the EP 7.4 out of 10, and Salute magazine rated the EP 2.5 out of 5.

Track listing

California
 "Worry No More" (feat. Lil Yachty & Santigold) - 3:22
 "Suicidal" (feat. Desiigner) - 3:26
 "Look Back" (feat. DRAM) - 3:39
 "Wish" (feat. Trippie Redd) - 2:55
 "Color Blind" (feat. Lil Xan) - 2:56
 "Get It Right" (feat. MØ & GoldLink) [Remix] - 2:52

References

2018 EPs
Diplo albums
Mad Decent albums